Banwol Station is a railway station on Seoul Subway Line 4 in Ansan.

Station layout

References

Metro stations in Ansan
Seoul Metropolitan Subway stations
Railway stations opened in 1988